CULS may refer to:

 Cambridge University Law Society, a student-run legal society at the University of Cambridge
 Columbia University Library System, the sixth largest academic library in the United States
 Czech University of Life Sciences Prague, an agricultural university established in 1906